Luigi "Jerry" Bertocchi (10 June 1965 - 17 November 2017) is an Italian former athlete who competed in the sprint hurdles. He represented his country at one outdoor and two indoor World Championships.

Biography
His personal bests are 13.69 seconds in the 110 metres hurdles (+2.0 m/s; Potenza 1991) and 7.81 seconds in the 60 metres hurdles (Liévin 1987). He died in November 2017 of cancer.

Achievements

References

External links
 

1965 births
2017 deaths
Italian male hurdlers
World Athletics Championships athletes for Italy
Sportspeople from Bergamo
Athletes (track and field) at the 1987 Mediterranean Games
Athletes (track and field) at the 1991 Mediterranean Games
Athletes (track and field) at the 1993 Mediterranean Games
Mediterranean Games competitors for Italy